Domenic Michael Abounader (born March 11, 1995) is an American-born freestyle wrestler. Domestically, Abounader competed at St. Edward High School, where he won three state titles, finishing his senior season undefeated and the number one ranked wrestler in the country at 182lbs. Abounader attended The University of Michigan where he was a Big Ten Champion and All-American.  Internationally, he competes for Lebanon, his father's home country. As a dual citizen, Domenic is eligible to compete for Lebanon since he never wrestled for the United States at the international level. In his first international tournament, he won a silver medal at the 2018 Asian Games, the first medalist for Lebanon in wrestling. He lost to Iran's Hassan Yazdani in the final match of the men's freestyle 86kg.

References

1995 births
Living people
Lebanese male sport wrestlers
Wrestlers at the 2018 Asian Games
Medalists at the 2018 Asian Games
Asian Games medalists in wrestling
Asian Games silver medalists for Lebanon
Michigan Wolverines wrestlers